Vittorio Bolla (12 January 1932 – 20 September 2002) was an Italian ice hockey player. He competed in the men's tournaments at the 1956 Winter Olympics and the 1964 Winter Olympics.

References

External links
 

1932 births
2002 deaths
Ice hockey people from Milan
Ice hockey players at the 1956 Winter Olympics
Ice hockey players at the 1964 Winter Olympics
Olympic ice hockey players of Italy